Holly Williams may refer to:

Holly Williams (journalist), Australian foreign correspondent and war correspondent
Holly Williams (musician) (b. 1981), American singer-songwriter
Holly Williams (writer), Welsh arts and features writer and theatre critic